State Route 157 (SR 157) is a primary state highway in the U.S. state of Virginia. The state highway runs  from SR 6 in Tuckahoe north to U.S. Route 33 (US 33) in Glen Allen. SR 157 passes through western Henrico County, a suburban area north and west of Richmond.

Route description

SR 157 begins at an intersection with SR 6 (Patterson Avenue) and the southern unnumbered portion of Gaskins Road, a four-lane divided highway, in Tuckahoe. The state highway heads north along Gaskins Road, a five-lane road with a center left-turn lane. When SR 157 reaches its four-way intersection with the northern unnumbered section of Gaskins Road and Quioccasin Road, the state highway turns east onto Quioccasin Road, a three-lane road with center turn lane. East of Quioccasin Middle School, SR 157 turns north onto Pemberton Road; Quioccasin Road continues east as a five-lane road with center turn lane. The state highway follows two-lane Pemberton Road north into the Henrico area of the county. SR 157 crosses Interstate 64 with no access prior to its intersection with US 250 (Broad Street); the Interstate Highway is accessed via Gaskins Road to the west. The state highway heads north from the U.S. Highway as Springfield Road, a four-lane divided highway. SR 157 intersects the northern end of Gaskins Road and Hungary Road. North of Nuckols Road, the state highway reduces to two lanes and gradually curves east into the Glen Allen area. SR 157 passes through several curves and has a right-angle turn from the north to the east at Francistown Road before reaching its northern terminus at US 33 (Staples Mill Road) in Glen Allen.

Major intersections

References

External links

Virginia Highways Project: VA 157

157
State Route 157